Route 192 is a  state route in the U.S. states of Connecticut and Massachusetts, serving the southeastern suburbs of Springfield. It connects the Hazardville section of the town of Enfield, Connecticut, to the town center of Longmeadow, Massachusetts. The Massachusetts portion of the route is maintained by the town, as opposed to MassDOT.

Route description
Route 192 begins as North Maple Street at an intersection with Route 190 in the Hazardville section of Enfield. It heads north to the village of North Thompsonville, where it intersects with Route 220. It continues north until Shaker Pines Lake, where the road then curves to the west. The road continues north across the state line as Shaker Road towards the town center of Longmeadow. After , Route 192 turns west onto Williams Street until it ends at an intersection with U.S. Route 5. Route 192 is a two-lane secondary road for its entire length. It is classified as a minor arterial road and carries traffic volumes of about 4,400 vehicles per day.

History
Route 192 was established as a new route in Connecticut during the 1932 state highway renumbering. Massachusetts extended the route number into Longmeadow in 1939. Route 192 has not had any significant changes since it was designated.

Major intersections

References

192
Transportation in Hartford County, Connecticut
192
Transportation in Hampden County, Massachusetts